The Order of Mwalimu Julius Kambarage Nyerere is the highest award of the Tanzanian Honours System. It is named after Julius Nyerere, the nation's first president.

History
It was instituted by President Jakaya Kikwete in December 2011 to honour the nation's past presidents during the 50th anniversary celebrations of the independence of Tanganyika (present day Tanzania Mainland).

Recipients

References

External links
 Photographs of the award ceremony

Orders, decorations, and medals of Tanzania
Awards established in 2011
2011 establishments in Tanzania
Julius Nyerere